The 6 Metre was a sailing event on the Sailing at the 1908 Summer Olympics program in Ryde.  Three races were scheduled. Each nation could enter up to 2 boats. 15 sailors, on 5 boats, from 4 nation competed.

Race schedule

Course area  
The following course was used during the 1908 Olympic 6-Metre regattas in all three races:
 Start at Ryde Pier
 No.2. Mother Bank Buoy
 East Measured Mile Buoy
 East Sturbridge Buoy
 Finish at Ryde Pier

Weather conditions

Final results 
The 1908 Olympic scoring system was used. All competitors were male.

Daily standings

Other information

Extra awards 
 Gilt commemorative medal:
 Thomas McMeekin owner of Dormy
 Silver commemorative medal:
 R. Osterrieth Owner of Zut
 Johan Leuchars owner of Sibindi
 R. Delagrave owner of Guyoni
Challenge vase of sèvres china given by the President of the France Republic:
 Thomas McMeekin owner of Dormy

Further reading 
 
 
"Olympics, 1908" International Six Metre Archive. Retrieved 25 January 2021.

References 

6 Metre
6 Metre (keelboat)